Borøya is an island in the western section of Oslofjord (Vestfjorden), within the borders of the municipality of Bærum.

Islands of Viken (county)
Geography of Bærum